The 1995–96 Sporting de Gijón season was the 34th season of the club in La Liga, the 20th consecutive after its last promotion.

Overview
Ricardo Rezza, who saved the team in the relegation playoffs the previous season, was sacked after round 19, when the club earned five consecutive losses. Ramiro Solís took the helm one week before José Manuel Díaz Novoa signed until the end of the season.

After scoring 18 goals in La Liga and four more in the Copa del Rey, Julio Salinas was called up with the Spanish national team to play the UEFA Euro 1996.

Squad

From the youth squad

Competitions

La Liga

Results by round

League table

Matches

Copa del Rey

Matches

Squad statistics

Appearances and goals

|}

References

External links
Profile at BDFutbol
Official website

Sporting de Gijón seasons
Sporting de Gijon